Park Place was a terminal of the Hudson and Manhattan Railroad (H&M) located at the intersection of Park Place and Centre Street in Newark, New Jersey, across the street from Military Park nearby Newark Public Service Terminal. The terminal opened on November 26, 1911, after the H&M extended its line westward from Grove Street in Jersey City to Summit Avenue, Manhattan Transfer, and over the Centre Street Bridge to Newark. The terminal closed on June 20, 1937, after the H&M tracks were realigned to serve the new Newark Penn Station.

The H&M was taken over by the Port Authority of New York and New Jersey in 1962, the system becoming the Port Authority Trans-Hudson (PATH). The New Jersey Performing Arts Center is sited on the location of the terminal adjacent to the Newark Light Rail's NJPAC/Center Street station.

See also
New Jersey Railroad
Four Corners (Newark)
Newark and New York Railroad

References

External links
1931 aerial view of terminal
Park Place H&M station image (WorldNYCSubway.org)

Transportation in Newark, New Jersey
Former railway stations in New Jersey
PATH stations in New Jersey
Railway stations in the United States opened in 1911
Railway stations closed in 1937
1937 disestablishments in New Jersey
1911 establishments in New Jersey
Railway stations in Essex County, New Jersey